The List of mills in Greater Manchester, England is divided by metropolitan borough: